Ernst-Günter Habig (14 September 1935 – 14 March 2012) was a German professional footballer.

Career
Habig played club football for Union Köln, 1. FC Köln and Viktoria 04 Köln. Habig also participated at the 1956 Summer Olympics.

Later life and death
He died in Cologne on 14 March 2012.

References

1935 births
2012 deaths
German footballers
1. FC Köln players
Olympic footballers of the United Team of Germany
Footballers at the 1956 Summer Olympics
SC Fortuna Köln managers
Alemannia Aachen managers
FC Viktoria Köln players
FC Viktoria Köln managers
SC Fortuna Köln players
Association football midfielders
German football managers
Footballers from Cologne